Zabrus robustus is a species of ground beetle in the Pelor subgenus that is endemic to Greece.

References

Beetles described in 1831
Beetles of Europe
Endemic fauna of Greece
Zabrus